Henrique Frade (3 August 1934 in Formiga, Minas Gerais – 15 May 2004 in Rio de Janeiro, Brazil) was an association football striker.

Third high scorer in Flamengo's history with 214 goals, Henrique won the 1961 Rio São Paulo Tournament and had 402 appearances for the club between 1954 and 1963.

He also played for Nacional Montevideo, Portuguesa-SP and Atlético Mineiro.

Despite having several caps for Brazil during 1956 and 1957, Henrique was not selected to the 1958 FIFA World Cup due to a sprained foot. Instead, he saw Palmeiras' Mazzola joining his Flamengo's teammates Joel, Moacir, Dida and Zagallo.

He had appearances for Brazil national team between 1951 and 1961.

Honours

Rio de Janeiro State League: 1954, 1955
Torneio Rio–São Paulo: 1961
Uruguayan League: 1963

References

External links
 

1934 births
2004 deaths
Brazilian footballers
Brazil international footballers
Club Nacional de Football players
Clube Atlético Mineiro players
CR Flamengo footballers
Association football forwards
Expatriate footballers in Uruguay